FC Gornyak Gramoteino was a Russian football team from Gramoteino, Kemerovo Oblast. It played professionally in 1992 and 1993. Their best result was 5th place in the Zone 7 of the Russian Second Division in 1993.

External links
  Team history at KLISF

Association football clubs established in 1992
Association football clubs disestablished in 1994
Defunct football clubs in Russia
Sport in Kemerovo Oblast
1992 establishments in Russia
1994 disestablishments in Russia